Uncle Buck is an American sitcom television series starring Kevin Meaney, based on the 1989 film of the same name. The series aired on CBS from September 10, 1990 to March 9, 1991 during the 1990–91 season.

Synopsis
Buck Russell is a slob and the brother of Bob Russell who drinks, smokes, and gambles. He is also the uncle of Bob's children Tia, Maizy, and Miles. One day, Buck is named the guardian of Tia, Maizy, and Miles after Bob and Cindy are suddenly killed in a car accident. Buck is sometimes assisted in raising his nieces and nephew by their maternal grandmother Maggie Hogoboom.

Cast
 Kevin Meaney as Buck Russell 
 Dah-ve Chodan as Tia Russell 
 Jacob Gelman as Miles Russell
 Sarah Martineck as Maizy Russell
 Audrey Meadows as Maggie Hogoboom
 Lacey Chabert as Nancy

Episodes

Critical reception
The show was panned by critics. The pilot caused a minor controversy because of a scene where Maizy tells Uncle Buck: "You suck!"; this is believed to be the first time this phrase had been used on network television. After airing on Monday nights for two months, due to competition with MacGyver and The Fresh Prince of Bel-Air, the latter of which premiered on the same day, it was moved to Friday, in an attempt by CBS to establish a comedy night swapping with Evening Shade. The ratings dropped from there with strong competition from ABC's Top 20 hit Full House, and it was cancelled shortly after, having aired only 16 episodes and leaving several filmed episodes unaired.

External links

Stand-Up Cutup Kevin Meaney Shines as a Slob on Uncle Buck - People
TV Time Capsule: Uncle Buck
Uncle Buck in Jump The Shark

Uncle Buck (franchise)
1990s American sitcoms
1990 American television series debuts
1991 American television series endings
CBS original programming
English-language television shows
Live action television shows based on films
Television series by Universal Television
Television shows set in Illinois